Charles Mills was launched at Chester in 1810. She made two voyages for the British East India Company (EIC). She then traded between London and India under a license from the EIC. She foundered on 20 May 1822 with the loss of most of the people on board.

Career
Captain George Raincock received a letter of marque on 11 May 1811. The EIC had her measured and then chartered her for two voyages.

Raincock sailed from Torbay on 30 May 1811, bound for Bombay. Charles Mills reached Madeira on 30 June with a number of other India-bound vessels. Their escort, and another East Indiaman arrived the next day. They were expected to resume their voyages at the end of June. They actually sailed on 2 July. Charles Mills arrived at Bombay on 25 October. Homeward bound, she reached St Helena on 23 February 1812, and arrived at the Downs on 10 May.

Raincock sailed from Portsmouth on 2 June 1813, bound for Bombay. Charles Mills reached Madeira on 21 June, and arrived at Bombay on 24 October. Homeward bound, she was at Point de Galle on 12 January 1814 and the Cape of Good Hope on 1 March. Charles Mills arrived at Long Reach on 1 June.

Listings of departures in Lloyd's Register for India of ships licensed by the EIC provide the following information:

Fate
Charles Mills, sailing from Bengal, left the pilot on 11 May 1822. Sixty-six persons drowned; the seven survivors were at sea in a small boat for five days before they approached land. While the surf prevented them from landing, the French brig Scythe, which was sailing from Mauritius to Calcutta, came upon them and rescued them. The survivors included Captain Wise, Mr. Roberts (the second officer), and five others. Scythe took them to Kedgeree, where they arrived on 28 May. The entry for Charles Mills in the 1823 Lloyd's Register carried the annotation "lost".

She survived after having thrown a third of her cargo overboard. She was so damaged that she had to put back into Bengal.

Citations

References

1810 ships
Age of Sail merchant ships
Merchant ships of the United Kingdom
Maritime incidents in May 1822